The United States U-19 men's national soccer team is controlled by the United States Soccer Federation.

Recent results and fixtures

2023

Current squad
20 players were called up for the March 2023 friendlies in Argentina.

Caps and goals are current as of 27 September 2022, after match against .

Recent call-ups
The following players have been called up in the past 12 months.

 June Friendlies

Honors
 Slovenia Nations Cup
 Winners (1): 2022

Head coaches

See also
 United States Soccer Federation
 United States men's national soccer team
 United States men's national under-17 soccer team
 United States men's national under-20 soccer team
 United States men's national under-23 soccer team

References

External links
 

Soc
North American national under-19 association football teams
Youth soccer in the United States
U19
U19